Quy Nhơn Port is the major port of Bình Định Province, Vietnam. It is located in Hai Cang (meaning sea port) ward at the eastern tip of Quy Nhơn city.

Quy Nhơn Port is the most accessible major port not only for Bình Định Province, but also for the Central Highlands provinces of Gia Lai and Kon Tum and even parts of Laos and Cambodia such as Attapeu Province and Ratanakiri Province. National Route 19 has its starting point at Quy Nhơn Port and leads up to Gia Lai Province and Lệ Thanh border gate on the border to Cambodia (247 km from Quy Nhơn Port). This road also connects the port to National Road 1.

References

Ports and harbours of Vietnam
Buildings and structures in Bình Định province
Geography of Bình Định province